The Clare Junior A Football Championship (abbreviated to Clare JAFC) is an annual Gaelic football club competition organised by the Clare County Board of the GAA for clubs below the Intermediate and Senior grades. It is contested by the top-ranking Junior clubs in County Clare, Ireland. It is the third-tier adult competition of the Clare football pyramid.

The 2022 Clare Junior Champions are Liscannor who defeated Killimer to be crowned champions for the second time at this grade.

History
The Clare JAFC was introduced in the early 1920s as a countywide competition for Gaelic football clubs deemed not eligible for the Senior or Intermediate grades, and also for the second- and third-string teams from higher-ranked clubs.

The winners of the Clare JAFC are promoted to the Clare Intermediate Football Championship for the following year.

Qualification for subsequent competitions

Munster Club Football Championship
The winning club also qualifies to represent Clare in the Munster Junior Club Football Championship (the winners of which go on to compete in the All-Ireland Junior Club Football Championship). However, if a second- or third-string team wins the Clare JAFC they are replaced by the highest finishing first-string team. No Clare club has ever won the Munster title. 2001 champions Éire Óg, Ennis qualified for the Munster final but lost to St. Michael's-Foilmore of Kerry. 2007 champions O'Callaghan's Mills qualified for the Munster final but lost to Canovee of Cork. 2017 champions Coolmeen progressed to the Munster final but lost to Templenoe of Kerry.

Roll of honour

See also
 Clare Senior Football Championship
 Clare Football League Div. 1 (Cusack Cup)
 Clare Intermediate Football Championship
 Clare Under-21 A Football Championship

References

Gaelic football competitions in County Clare